Robert McQueen Grant (November 25, 1917 – June 10, 2014) was an American academic theologian and the Carl Darling Buck Professor Emeritus of Humanities and of New Testament and Early Christianity at the University of Chicago (in the former Department of New Testament & Early Christian Literature and also in the Divinity School). His scholarly work focused on the New Testament and Early Christianity.

Life
Grant is the son of well-known New Testament scholar Frederick C. Grant and Helen McQueen Grant (née Hardie). He earned a Bachelor of Arts degree with distinction from Northwestern University in 1938; attended the Episcopal Theological School in Cambridge, Massachusetts from 1938-1939; moved to Columbia University in 1939-1940; and earned a Bachelor of Divinity degree from Union Theological Seminary in 1941. In 1942, Grant was ordained to the priesthood in the Episcopal Church. He went on to earn an S.T.M. in 1942 and a Th.D. in 1944, both from Harvard Divinity School. During this time he also ministered at St James Episcopal Church in South Groveland, Massachusetts.

From 1944 until 1953, Grant served as instructor and ultimately professor of New Testament studies in the School of Theology at the University of the South. He became associate professor at the University of Chicago Divinity School in 1953 and full professor in 1958. In 1973 Grant was named Carl Darling Buck Professor of the Humanities.

Grant’s commitment to the racial desegregation of the South began during his tenure at the University of the South. In 1952, the trustees of the School of Theology voted against the mandate from the provincial synod of the Episcopal Church to admit African Americans to the School.  Grant was one of eight theology faculty members who sent a letter of protest to the Chairman of the Board of Trustees charging that the board's decision was unethical. All threatened to resign if the decision were not rescinded. 
By 1953 all of the eight faculty members had left and been replaced.
His engagement with civil liberties continued and he joined other ministers and Chicago faculty on the march on Selma in March 1965 after “Bloody Sunday.”

Throughout his career, Grant served as president of a number of professional societies: the Society of Biblical Literature and Exegesis (1959), the Chicago Society of Biblical Research (1963-1964), the American Society of Church History (1970) and the North American Patristics Society (1975).

Grant was a visiting lecturer at Vanderbilt University (1945-1947), at Seabury-Western Theological Seminary (1954-1955) and a visiting professor at Yale University (1964–65). He was also Fulbright Research Professor at the University of Leiden from 1950-1951. He was thrice the recipient of Guggenheim Fellowships (in 1950, 1954 and 1959). Grant was honoured with Doctor of Divinity degrees from Seabury-Western Theological Seminary (1969) and the University of Glasgow (1979).

Grant married Margaret Huntington Horton, daughter of American Protestant clergyman and academic leader Douglas Horton, on 21 December 1940. He died at his home in Hyde Park, Chicago, Illinois in 2014.

Work
Professor Grant was the most prolific and influential American historian of ancient Christianity of his generation.  The author of over thirty-three books and countless articles, Grant’s work was characterized by philological exactness, a deep knowledge of the ancient world, and philosophical and theological finesse, together with a tight prose style and dry wit. He published on a wide range of topics dealing with early Christianity, including the New Testament, the Apostolic Fathers, "Gnosticism", biblical interpretation, the second-century Christian apologists, Origen and Origenism and the Graeco-Roman intellectual background of early Christian writers. He has also published several important studies of U-Boat warfare in World War I, recently reprinted.

Select publications

Books

Edited by
  - author of three volumes (see above)

Festschriften

References

External links
 Robert M. Grant at The University of Chicago Divinity School

1917 births
2014 deaths
American historians of religion
Northwestern University alumni
American biblical scholars
New Testament scholars
Union Theological Seminary (New York City) alumni
Harvard Divinity School alumni
University of Chicago faculty
University of Chicago Divinity School faculty
Sewanee: The University of the South faculty
Presidents of the American Society of Church History